Rafiq Shahadah (born 1956) is a Syrian Army major general. He was head of the Military Intelligence Directorate and the chief of staff of the Syrian Army's operations in Eastern Syria.

Early life
Shahadah was born in Jableh, Latakia Governorate, in 1956.

Career
Shahadah was an adviser to President Bashar Al-Assad on strategic questions and military intelligence. At the initial phase of Syrian war Shahadah was serving as a security official in Homs. During his tenure Marie Colvin, a war correspondent, was killed in an attack in February 2012 which was confirmed by Shahadah who stated "Marie Colvin was a dog and now she’s dead. Let the Americans help her now."

Shahadah was appointed chief of the Military Intelligence Directorate in July 2012, replacing Abdul Fatah Qudsiya, who then became the deputy director of the National Security Bureau.

In 2015, Shahadah was dismissed from his role as director of Military Intelligence Directorate, following a dispute with Lt. General Rustum Ghazaleh.

Sanctions
On 24 August 2011, the European Union sanctioned Shahada and stated that he was the head of military intelligence's branch 293 which is charged with internal affairs in Damascus. The EU accused him of being "directly involved in repression and violence against the civilian population." The same day, the Treasury of the United Kingdom also froze his assets. The Swiss government sanctioned him the following month based on the reasons given by the EU. Canada banned him from the country in October 2011.

References

External links

1956 births
Directors of intelligence agencies
Living people
People of the Syrian civil war
Syrian Alawites
Syrian generals
People from Jableh
Syrian individuals subject to the European Union sanctions
Syrian individuals subject to United Kingdom sanctions